John Mais (1778-1853) was a planter and slave-owner in Jamaica. He was elected to the House of Assembly of Jamaica in 1820 for the parish of Saint Andrew.

References 

Members of the House of Assembly of Jamaica
Planters from the British West Indies
1853 deaths
Saint Andrew Parish, Jamaica
1778 births